Jung Hyun-cheol (born 26 April 1993) is a South Korean footballer who plays for FC Seoul.

Club career
He joined Gyeongnam FC in January 2015.

International career
He played in 2013 FIFA U-20 World Cup and scored for South Korea U-20 team in the quarterfinals.

Club Statistics

Club

References

External links 

Jung Hyun-cheol – National Team stats at KFA 

1993 births
Living people
Association football defenders
South Korean footballers
Gyeongnam FC players
FC Seoul players
K League 2 players
K League 1 players